Olympia Trails, also doing business under the brands ONE/Independent Bus for local bus service in Essex and Union counties in New Jersey and Megabus Northeast, LLC for the Megabus service that it directly operates, is a bus operator serving northern New Jersey with local and commuter bus service. It also formerly operated as Red & Tan in Hudson County for operations in Hudson County, New Jersey. It has been owned by Coach USA since 1998.

Routes

Current operations
Olympia Trails operates service under three different brands.

Olympia Trails brand
Under this brand, one route is operated:
The Newark Airport Express, operated between Midtown Manhattan and Newark Liberty International Airport at 15-minute intervals throughout the day. This old route was acquired from New Jersey Transit (NJT) in 1997, previously numbered 300.

ONE/Independent Bus brand
ONE/Independent Bus provides local service on routes centered in Essex County, New Jersey and Hudson County, New Jersey.

Megabus Northeast LLC

Under Megabus, Olympia Trails operates service from street stops near the Jacob K. Javits Convention Center to:
M21: Washington, D.C. via Baltimore (some service)
M22: Boston (selected services)
M23: Philadelphia (some weekday service)
M26: Manhattan (New York City), Syracuse, Rochester, Buffalo; and Niagara Falls and Toronto, ON, (Canada).
M27: Albany, New York via Ridgewood, New Jersey

Megabus also operates to Boston, Massachusetts, Philadelphia, Pennsylvania, and Atlantic City. Most schedules and runs on the M22 Boston service are operated by Dattco from their facility in Metropolitan Boston. The Philadelphia line is under a split-operation with Eastern Travel, with most runs operating out of Coach USA's Philadelphia facility, and Megabus acts solely as a ticket agent for Academy Bus Lines (utilizing its own fleet).

Former operations

Red & Tan in Hudson County brand
Under the Red & Tan in Hudson County brand, Coach USA operated bus routes in Jersey City, Bayonne, Staten Island  and to the PABT that have since been discontinued, folded into other lines, or taken over by other operators.

References

External links
Coach USA official website
Megabus Northeast

Surface transportation in Greater New York
Stagecoach Group bus operators in the United States and Canada
Bus transportation in New Jersey
Intercity bus companies of the United States
Transportation companies based in New Jersey